Anastasia Alexandrovna Aravina (b. 19 January 1983) is a Russian theater and film actress.

Early life 
She was born in Moscow. She is the daughter of film director Alexander Aravina, Aravina chose her profession early in life.

After school, she enrolled at the Russian Academy of Theatre Arts, where she studied acting under Vadim. Her first serious experience was in 2001, while she was still a student. She made her debut as Zina in the television series Moscow Windows. She appeared in a cameo role in Turkish March. In 2003, Aaravina received a starring role in the TV series Best city in the world, directed by her father.

Upon graduation in 2004, the actress continued to appear on television. She appeared in the spy drama Red Orchestra. In 2005, Anastasia appeared in an episode of the fourth season of Kamensky. The following year she debuted in the film melodrama Nanjing landscape. Also in 2006, she played Agnes in television historical drama Tomorrow's care. Soon she appeared in an episode of Matchmaker, and in 2008 played Anya Kapitsinu in a detective serial If our destiny. She then appeared in several TV series, such as Will the night, Detective stunt, Angel on duty and New life detective Gurov. Continued.

In 2010, Aravina took the lead role in a spy adventure series on topics Last meeting, then appeared in the crime drama serials The mother's heart.

Filmography 
Filmography Anastasia Aravina 

2012 Country 03 - Oksana girl Bury
2012 Angel on duty 2 - Lena
2011 Piranha (not completed) - Lena
2011 The team eight - Lt. Lisa Myakutina
2011 St. John's wort-3 - the wife Bersteneva
2010 Mother's Heart - Sasha matron
2010 The Last Meeting - Kate Ioannina (main role)
2010 New Life detective Gurov. Continued - Face
2010 Free cake does not happen film number 3
2010 Angel on duty - Lisa
2008 Stunt Man - Mary
2008 Will the night (Russia, Ukraine) - the waitress
2008 If we destiny - Anya Kapitsyna actress, mistress of the Vlasov
2007 Matchmaker - Sasha
2007 Masquerade 
2006 Nanjing landscape - The lady in the car
2006 Tomorrow's worries - Agnes
2005 Kamensky-4 - Dasha
2005 Personal movie 1
2004 The Red Chapel» Sarkanā Kapela (Latvia, Russia) - Juliette (leading role)
2003 The best city in the world - Zina Terekhov (leading role)
2002 Turkish March (Season 3) - Nurse
2002 The end of the film Movie 2
2001 Moscow Windows - Zina

References

External links 

1983 births
Living people
Russian television actresses
Russian film actresses
Actresses from Moscow